The 2020 Limerick Premier Intermediate Hurling Championship was the seventh staging of the Limerick Premier Intermediate Hurling Championship since its establishment by the Limerick County Board in 2014. The championship was scheduled to begin in April 2020, however, it was postponed indefinitely due to the impact of the COVID-19 pandemic on Gaelic games. The championship eventually began on 24 July 2020 and ended on 13 September 2020.

On 13 September 2020, Kildimo/Pallaskenry won the championship after a 0-22 to 1-13 defeat of Mungret/St. Paul's in the final at the LIT Gaelic Grounds. It was their first ever championship title in this grade.

Results

Group 1

Group 1 table

Group 1 results

Group 2

Group 2 table

Group 2 results

Relegation section

Playoff

Knockout stage

Semi-finals

Final

References

External links

 Limerick GAA website

Limerick Premier Intermediate Hurling Championship
Limerick Championship
Limerick Premier Intermediate Hurling Championship